This is an episode list for Four Rooms. All dates are the first broadcast in the United Kingdom.

Series overview 

{| class="wikitable plainrowheaders" style="text-align:center;"
! scope="col" style="padding:0 9px;" rowspan="2" colspan="2"| Series
! scope="col" style="padding:0 9px;" rowspan="2"| Episodes
! scope="col" style="padding:0 90px;" colspan="2"| Originally aired
|-
! scope="col" | First aired
! scope="col" | Last aired
|-
| scope="row" style="background:#0000FF;" | 
| 1
| 8
| 
| 
|-
| scope="row" style="background:#00FF00;" | 
| 2
| 8
| 
| 
|-
| scope="row" style="background:#FE2E2E;" | 
| 3
| 30
| 
| 
|-
| scope="row" style="background:#FF7E00;" | 
| 4
| 30
| 
| 
|-
| scope="row" style="background:#FF2EFF;" | 
| 5
| 20
| 
| 
|}

Episodes

Series 1 (2011)

Series 2 (2012)

Series 3 (2013)

Series 4 (2014–15)

Series 5 (2016–19)

References

Four Rooms